Cast Acrylic is a form of poly(methyl methacrylate) (PMMA). It is formed by casting the monomer, methyl methacrylate, mixed with initiators and possibly other additives into a form or mold. Sheet and rod stock are generated by casting into static forms, while tubing is done in rotational molds.

Advantages 

It has better thermal stability, higher resistance to crazing when exposed to solvents, wider thermoforming range than extruded acrylic. Cast acrylic has a better ability to be reworked hot and it is known for its superior surface finish and optical properties. Also cast acrylic is more scratch resistant than extruded acrylic.
Cast acrylic is also preferred over extruded in applications that require machinings, such as turning on Engine Lathe or milling/drilling. Extruded acrylic, with far less thermal stability, tends to melt and clog cutting tools. Even with slow speeds and much coolant, extruded acrylic does not produce the surface finish and tight tolerances achievable with cast acrylic.

Properties 
Advantages of Acrylic (PMMA):
Excellent optical clarity and transparency
Highly resistant to variations in temperature
Up to 17 times the impact resistance of ordinary glass
Half the weight of glass and ideal for precision machining
Highly resistant to many different chemicals
Has certain properties making it an ideal material for use in a wide range of applications, including medical, life sciences and food/beverage testing.

PMMA – PolyMethyl MethAcrylate.  Crylux, Plexiglas, Acrylite, Lucite, and Perspex are trade names for Acrylic.

Technical specification 
General Properties: 
Relative Density 1.19 g/cm3 
Rockwell Hardness M 102 
Water Absorption 0.2% 
Flammability Class 3 (BS 476 pt 7), UL94 HB
Mechanical: 
Tensile Strength 75 MPa 
Flexural Strength 115 MPa
Thermal Properties: 
Minimum Service Temperature -40°C 
Maximum Service Temperature 80°C 
Softening Point >110°C 
Linear Expansion 7.7×10-5
Optical Properties: 
Light Transmission >92% 
Refractive Index 1.49

Usage 

This type of acrylic is often used for aquariums, awards, financial tombstones, trophies, corporate gifts, and other products that require shaping or machining. It tends to be more clear and made to a higher quality standard, but in doing so makes it more expensive than extruded acrylic. Cast Acrylic also cuts smoother then extruded which makes it very popular with crafters as mentioned below.

Cast Acrylic has become very popular for use by crafters using Acrylic Blanks. Acrylic blanks refer to blank objects or shapes made from acrylic plastic that are used as a base or starting point for a craft project. Crafters use acrylic blanks in a variety of ways, depending on the type and size of the blank. Here are some examples of how crafters use acrylic blanks: 

Keychains and charms: Acrylic shapes can be cut by lasers into small shapes and decorated with paint, vinyl, or glitter to create custom keychains or charms. Crafters can add their own designs or use stencils and templates to create unique shapes.

Jewelry: Acrylic blanks can be used as a base for creating jewelry, such as earrings or pendants. Crafters can add their own designs or images to the acrylic blank using paint, markers, or vinyl.

Signs and home decor: Acrylic blanks can be cut into larger shapes to create signs or home decor pieces. Crafters can add custom designs or messages using paint, vinyl, or decals.

Cake toppers and decorations: Acrylic blanks can be used to create cake toppers and decorations for special occasions such as weddings, birthdays, or holidays. Crafters can customize the acrylic blank with paint or vinyl to match the theme of the event.

References

See also

 Financial tombstone
 Acrylic embedment

Plastics industry